Taree is a town on the Mid North Coast, New South Wales, Australia. Taree and nearby Cundletown were settled in 1831 by William Wynter. Since then Taree has grown to a population of 26,381, and is the centre of a significant agricultural district. It is 16 km from the Tasman Sea coast, and 317 km north of Sydney. Taree can be reached by train via the North Coast Railway, and by the Pacific Highway. Taree railway station is on the North Coast line of the NSW TrainLink network. It is serviced by six NSW TrainLink trains daily: three heading to Sydney, another three heading North to Grafton, Casino or Brisbane.
Taree is within the local government area of Mid-Coast Council, the state electorate of Myall Lakes and the Federal electorate of Lyne.

Name
The name Taree is derived from "tareebit", a Biripi word meaning tree by the river, or more specifically, the Sandpaper Fig (Ficus coronata).

History
The Biripi were the indigenous people of what is now known as Taree. The Aboriginal population of the Manning River was relatively dense before colonisation by Europeans.

In 1826, Assistant Surveyor Henry Dangar was instructed by John Oxley as Surveyor General (and a shareholder in the Australian Agricultural Company) to survey the land between Port Stephens and the Hastings River. During this expedition, Dangar identified that 'Harrington Lake' was a river with two entrances to the sea. Later in 1826, the river was named the Manning River by Robert Dawson for the Deputy Governor of the Australian Agricultural Company, William Manning.

In 1829, Governor Darling proclaimed the division of the settlement of the colony of New South Wales into nineteen counties. The northern limit of the settlement was declared to be the Manning River.

Taree was laid out as a private town in 1854 by Henry Flett, the son-in-law of William Wynter who had originally settled the area in 1831.  had been set aside for the private township and 40 lots were initially sold. Taree was declared a municipality on 26 March 1885 and the first municipal council was elected by the residents. In the early 1800s the road from Newcastle to Port Macquarie came via Gloucester and forded the river near Wingham. Boats could not go further upstream than this due to narrowing of the river and rapids. Hence a town formed at Wingham, about a day's ride from Gloucester. Timber getting, especially cedar, ensured goods were brought to Wingham and then shipped to Newcastle and beyond by boat. Coopernook similarly formed a local shipping hub. In 1844, the government of New South Wales had established Wingham as its administrative centre. When the North Coast railway line came through in 1913, it ended initially at Taree. Even before the rest of the line was completed it became apparent that it was safer to send goods by rail to Newcastle and Sydney rather than hazarding the bar at the outlet to the river at Harrington where many ships had been lost. Although connected to the railway, sea transport continued to dominate along the North Coast until the 1930s. This changed when the Martin Bridge replaced the ferry across the Manning River in 1940. River traffic significantly reduced after this, ensuring Taree's place as the centre of business.

The oldest surviving building in Taree is the old St Paul's Presbyterian Church, built-in 1869 in the Victorian Gothic Revival style, next door to the current building, in Albert Street.

A record breaking rain event in March 2021 intensified, sweeping debris such as a water tank and shipping container into the Manning River that struck the Martin Bridge. Properties in Taree South and Glenthorne were inundated as well as the river peaked at 5.7 metres, falling just short of the historical high of 6 metres in 1929.

In the 24 hours to 9am July 7 2022, a record 305mm of rain was recorded in town. Since records began in 1881, this was the wettest day in the history of Taree.

Heritage listings 
Taree has a number of heritage-listed sites, including:
 North Coast railway: Taree railway station

Climate
Taree experiences a humid subtropical climate (Köppen: Cfa, Trewartha: Cfal/Cfbl); with hot summers and mild winters; and with a moderately high precipitation amount of 1,149.7 millimetres (45.25 in), with moderate precipitation even during its drier months. The highest temperature recorded at Taree was 45.7 °C (114.3 °F) on the 12th of February 2017; the lowest recorded was -4.0 °C (24.8 °F) on the 14th of June 2004, the 14th of July 2002, and the 29th of August 2003. The area features 102.5 clear days and 120.9 cloudy days annually.

Economy

Of the 17,820 people resident in Taree; 3,319 worked full-time and 2,169 worked part-time. The unemployment rate is approximately double the national average. The most common industries of employment in retail, government and aged care. The median weekly household income is $719. This compares with a national average of $1,234. A plurality (35.4%) of children live in families with no one in employment. 41.3% of households have a gross weekly income of less than $600; this is approximately half the national average.

Demographics
In the 2016 Census, there were 25,852 people in Taree. The median age in Taree is 46. 9.1% of the population is Aboriginal or Torres Strait Islander, with the average age amongst this group being 20. Taree has a significantly higher proportion of people aged 65+; with 25.5% of people over 65. This compares with a national average of 15.8%. 4.1% of residents are aged 85+, more than double the national average of 2.1%.

84.3% of people were born in Australia. The next most common countries of birth were England 2.3%, New Zealand 0.8% and Philippines 0.4%. 90.0% of people spoke only English at home.

The most common responses for religion were Anglican 28.5%, No Religion 23.4% and Catholic 17.5%.

Education
There are several public schools in the Taree area including Taree Public School, Taree High School, Taree West Public School, Manning Gardens Public School, Chatham Public School, Chatham High School, and Cundletown Public School.

Private schools in and around Taree include Manning District Adventist School, Tinonee, Manning Valley Anglican College, Cundletown, Taree Christian College, Kolodong, St Joseph's Primary School, and St Clare's High School.

Several post-secondary education and training facilities have a presence in Taree: the North Coast Institute of TAFE, Taree Community College, the Australian Technical College - Manning Valley Campus.

Media

Newspapers
The Manning River Times is based in Taree.

Television
All major digital-only television channels are available in Taree. The networks and the channels they broadcast are listed as follows:

 Seven (formerly Prime7), 7Two, 7mate, 7Bravo, 7flix. Seven Network owned channels.
 Nine (NBN Television), 9Go! and 9Gem, 9Life. Nine Network owned channels.
 10, (WIN Television), 10 Bold and 10 Peach. Network Ten affiliated channels.
 ABC, ABC Comedy, ABC Me and ABC News, part of the Australian Broadcasting Corporation.
 SBS, SBS Viceland, SBS Food and NITV, part of the Special Broadcasting Service.

Of the three main commercial networks:
Prime7 News airs a half-hour local news bulletin for the North Coast at 6 pm each weeknight. It is broadcast from studios in Canberra with reporters based at a local newsroom in the city.
NBN Television airs NBN News, a regional hour-long program including opt-outs for the Mid North Coast, every night at 6 pm. It is broadcast from studios in Newcastle with reporters based at a local newsroom in the city.
WIN Television airs short local news updates throughout the day, broadcast from its Wollongong studios.

Radio
There are four local radio stations, commercial stations 2RE and Max FM and community stations 2BOB and 2TLP.

The ABC broadcasts Triple J (96.3FM), ABC Classic FM (98.7FM), Radio National (97.1FM) and ABC Mid North Coast (95.5FM and 756AM)  into Taree.

Rhema FM Manning Great Lakes broadcasts from studios in nearby Wingham and Racing Radio is also broadcast to Taree.

Sport
The most popular sport in Taree is rugby league. The city has one team competing in the Group 3 Rugby League Premiership, the Taree City Bulls. The Old Bar Pirates and Wingham Tigers are based just outside the city in Wingham and Old Bar. The town has produed many NRL-calibre stars, most notably Latrell Mitchell and Danny Buderus.

Other sports played in the town include soccer, rugby union, tennis and cricket.

Rugby League Teams in Taree and Surrounds 
Senior Teams
 Taree City Bulls
 Wingham District Tigers
 Old Bar Pirates 

Junior Only Teams
 Taree Red Rovers (feeder club of Taree City Bulls)
 Taree Panthers (feeder club of Taree City Bulls)
 Old Bar Pirates
 Wingham District Tigers

Tourism

A local tourist attraction is a building called "The World's Largest Oyster", also called "The Big Oyster". Big Things are a common form of tourist attraction in Australia. Like the Big Merino and Big Banana, the 'Oyster' is an artifact based on local produce; the Manning River produced  oysters during 2013. The Big Oyster was an unsuccessful business venture, known to the locals as a 'Big Mistake', and is now home to a motor dealership.

The Manning Entertainment Centre was built in the 1980s as the cultural centre of the district. It seats 505 people and has previously presented artists such as the Sydney Symphony Orchestra, the Australian Ballet and Dame Joan Sutherland. Local performers, including the district eisteddfod and local amateur dramatic societies, use it to provide cultural opportunities for the local community.

Located next to the Entertainment Centre and the Visitor Information Centre at the northern entrance to Taree is the Manning Aquatic and Leisure Centre. The Aquatic Centre was built in the late 1990s – early 2000s to replace the Taree Pool, which has been redeveloped into a public park with outdoor stage.

The Manning Regional Art Gallery is located in a cottage-style building next to Taree Public School. The art gallery hosts a changing selection of works by local artists and visiting exhibitions.

Nearby towns include historic Wingham, Tinonee, and the beachside town of Old Bar.

Annual events

January

Events in the NSW Rowing Association Annual Pointscore Rowing Regatta are held at Endeavour Place in Taree during the third week of January. This Regatta runs over three days (Friday to Sunday) and consists of over 200 races with more than 500 competitors travelling from many parts of New South Wales to compete.
The Manning River Summer Festival runs throughout the month of January, incorporating the town's New Year's celebrations, a "Family Fun Day" in Queen Elizabeth Park on Australia Day, and also vide variety of cultural events.

March / April

The Easter Powerboat Classic is held on the Manning River near Queen Elizabeth Park during the Easter Long Weekend.

August

The Taree Gold Cup is a prestigious horse racing event held at the Bushland Drive Racecourse.

October

The Taree Annual Show is held the second weekend in October. It consists of a sideshow, precision driving team, rodeo events, and cattle and livestock judging.

Notable people

Academic
 Murray Batchelor – Mathematical physicist
 John H. Coates – Mathematician
 Clem Tisdell – Economist

Arts, entertainment and media
 Sir Dick Boyer  – Former Chairman of the ABC 
 Liz Hayes – Television reporter
 Ian Moffitt – Journalist and author
 Leslie Allan Murray  – Poet
 Amanda Thane – Operatic soprano
 Jim Frazier - Inventor and Artist 

Politics and public service
 Sir Leslie Boyce  – British Conservative Party politician
 Dr Ken Henry  – Former Secretary to The Treasury
 Lewis Martin – Politician
 Mark Vaile  – Former Deputy Prime Minister and National Party leader

Sport
 Matt Adamson – Rugby league footballer
 Phil Adamson – Rugby league footballer
 Troy Bayliss – Professional motorcycle racer
 Aaron Bird – Cricketer
 David Boyd – Rugby league footballer
 Kasey Brown – Professional squash player
 Danny Buderus – Rugby league footballer
 Coral Buttsworth – Tennis player
 Mal Cochrane – Rugby league footballer
 Boyd Cordner – Rugby league footballer
 Damian Cudlin – Professional motorcycle racer
 Daniel Dumas – Rugby league footballer
 Scott Dureau – Rugby league footballer
 Peter Gallagher – Rugby league footballer
 Josh Graham – Rugby union and rugby league footballer 
 Ben Harris – Rugby league footballer 
 Leigh Marning – Rhythmic gymnast and contortionist
 Luke McKenzie – Professional Triathlete
 Latrell Mitchell – Rugby league footballer
 Jarrod Mullen – Rugby league footballer 
 Jade North – Soccer player 
 Erin Osborne – Cricketer
 Stewart Pike  – Paralympic swimmer
 Ian Ruff – Olympic medallist sailor
 Michael Sullivan – Rugby league footballer
 Adam Woolnough – Rugby league footballer

See also

 List of cities in Australia
 Taree Airport
 List of World's Largest Roadside Attractions

References

External links 

 
 "World's Largest Oyster" - picture
 Greater Taree City Council website
 Manning River Times